Mahdi Ali Hassan Redha (born 20 April 1965 in Dubai) is a former Emirati footballer and current coach. He is currently the coach of Shabab Al-Ahli.

From 2010 until 2012, Ali led the United Arab Emirates Olympic team to qualify for the 2012 Summer Olympics in London. It was the nation's first appearance. He also led the UAE to their second Arabian Gulf Cup title in 2013 and also led them to a third-place finish at the 2015 AFC Asian Cup.

Playing career
Ali took up football with Al Ahli's youth sides at age six, and he progressed steadily through their system. He made his first-team debut at the age of 16 in 1983. Ali won two UAE President's Cup medallions and played a crucial role in the 1988 final against Al Shabab.

Coaching career

Early years
Ali returned to football after that and has previously coached several United Arab Emirates national football teams at various age-levels. He has also managed some top-level clubs in his native country.
A former midfield player of note, Ali's coaching career began in 1998 with the U10s at the Al Ahli in Dubai.

He spent a year in London with his family in 2000 and earned a coaching certificate, and later the football association sent him to Germany for his A level certificate. The UAE FA called him in 2008, while he was on leave from his government job in Dubai, asking him if he would coach the U19 national team.

Youth levels
Ali has had unprecedented success in leading what has been dubbed the "golden generation" of Emirati players, beginning with the AFC U-19 Championship in 2008 and continuing with a final-eight performance in the FIFA U-20 World Cup in 2009 and a U23 Gulf Cup championship and a silver medal in the Asian Games.

On 7 April 2011, Baniyas appointed Ali as caretaker coach after the club parted company with Lutfi al Benzarti, who led them to promotion in 2009 and fourth in the Pro League in 2010. Baniyas were second in the league when Ali took charge and he maintained that position behind Al Jazira.

UAE national team
On 15 August 2012, he was appointed as the UAE senior team's coach. He became the fourth non-foreign manager of the national team after replacing Abdullah Masfar. Under his management, the UAE played so well as they finished first in the 2015 AFC Asian Cup qualification and gained the second Arabian Gulf Cup title in 2013, after the first one of Bruno Metsu.

He led United Arab Emirates to the 2015 AFC Asian Cup where they defeated Qatar and Bahrain and lost to Iran and faced Japan in quarter-final and won the match in penalties and reached to semi-finals. However, UAE lost to Australia in semi-finals and failed to progress to the final. His side defeated Iraq 3–2 in third/fourth place play-off and ended their campaign in third-place. He is also the first Emirati coach of national team in an AFC Asian Cup tournament. On 27 February 2015, he extended his contract with UAE until 2018. He resigned from his position after UAE loss to Australia 2–0 on the World Cup qualifications match on 28 March 2017.

Shabab Al Ahli
Ali coached Shabab Al Ahli during their first season in 2017–18 where they finished mid table, he left after his contract ended without winning any notable domestic trophies. He later returned to the club in the 2020–21 season after the club dismissed their previous coach for the poor start to the season. By late January, Ali would win the 2020 UAE Super Cup after defeating Sharjah 1–0 with an injury time goal scored by Mohammed Marzooq. Ali won his second honour with the club after a 5–4 victory on penalties against Al Nasr on the league cup final. Ali won his third honour in the president's cup final against Al Nasr after defeating them 2–1.

Managerial statistics

Honours

Player
Al Ahli
 President's Cup: 1988, 1996

Manager
United Arab Emirates U-19
 AFC U-19 Championship: 2008

United Arab Emirates U-23
 Asian Games silver medalists: 2010

United Arab Emirates
 Arabian Gulf Cup: 2013, third place 2014
 AFC Asian Cup third place: 2015

Shabab Al Ahli
 UAE President's Cup 2020–21
 UAE Super Cup: 2020
 UAE League Cup: 2020–21

Personal life
Mahdi was born in Dubai in 1965.
After his playing days, Ali attended the HCT – Dubai Men's College where he graduated as an electrical engineer and later assisted in the design of the Dubai Metro. While working for Dubai Municipality, he helped set up the Road Transit Authority (RTA), and masterminded Dubai's parking project and the ticketing system for the Dubai Metro.

References

External links
 
 

1965 births
Living people
Emirati footballers
United Arab Emirates international footballers
Al Ahli Club (Dubai) players
Association football midfielders
Emirati football managers
United Arab Emirates national football team managers
2015 AFC Asian Cup managers
Emirati people of Iranian descent
UAE Pro League players
UAE Pro League managers